GeoBar is the first local season of the reality show The Bar in Georgia.

Synopsis
Start Date: 10 October 2005.
End Date: 31 December 2005.
Duration: 83 days.
Contestants:
The Finalists: Beso (Winner) & Tato (Runner-up).
Evicted Contestants: Dito, Lena, Giorgi, Keti, Mamuka, Mari, Nata, Bajo, Teo & Teona.

Contestants

References

2005 television seasons